Jules François Paré (11 August 1755 in Rieux, Marne – 29 July 1819 in Rieux) was a French politician.

Life
A contemporary of Georges Jacques Danton at the collège at Troyes, Paré first became a clerk during his studies in Paris and then, thanks to his employer's support, received the post of departmental commissar and then of secretary to the provisional executive council when Georges Danton was summoned to the ministry of justice.  On 20 August 1793 he was made minister of the interior to replace Dominique Joseph Garat.  Denounced as a "new Roland" by François-Nicolas Vincent and Jacques René Hébert and as a "danoniste" by Georges Couthon, he was dismissed on 5 April 1794, but escaped punishment, particularly the guillotine which awaited his protector.  Under the French Directory, from 1796 he was commissaire to the Seine department and then administrator of military hospitals, and under the First French Empire he was made landowner of the small property in Champagne.

References

Histoire et dictionnaire de la Révolution française 1789-1799 by Jean Tulard, Jean-François Fayard, Alfred Fierro

1755 births
1819 deaths
People from Marne (department)
People of the French Revolution
French interior ministers
Burials at Père Lachaise Cemetery